The 2007 Tirreno–Adriatico cycle race took place from March 14 to March 20.

Stages

Stage 1 – 14-03-2007: Civitavecchia, 160 km

Stage 2 – 15-03-2007: Civitavecchia-Marsciano, 202 km

Stage 3 – 16-03-2007: Marsciano-Macerata, 213 km

Stage 4 – 17-03-2007: Pievebovigliana–Offagna, 161 km

Stage 5 – 18-03-2007: Civitanova Marche-Civitanova Alta, 20.5 km (ITT)

Stage 6 – 19-03-2007: San Benedetto del Tronto-San Giacomo, 164 km

Stage 7 – 20-03-2007: Civitella del Tronto–San Benedetto del Tronto, 177 km

Final standings

General classification

 NOTE: UCI ProTour points are not awarded to riders from UCI Professional Continental teams (e.g., Acqua & Sapone–Caffè Mokambo and Tinkoff Credit Systems).

Mountains classification

Points classification

Team classification

The following UCI ProTour and UCI Professional Continental teams were named to the 2007 Tirreno–Adriatico:

Jersey progress

External links
Race website

2007 UCI ProTour
2007
2007 in Italian sport